The 1940 Western State Teachers Broncos football team represented Western State Teachers College (later renamed Western Michigan University) as an independent during the 1940 college football season.  In their 12th season under head coach Mike Gary, the Broncos compiled a 2–5 record and were outscored by their opponents, 117 to 77.  The team played its home games at Waldo Stadium in Kalamazoo, Michigan.

Guard Wayne Falan and guard/quarterback Harold Benge were the team captains. Halfback Horace Coleman received the team's most outstanding player award.

Schedule

References

Western State Teachers
Western Michigan Broncos football seasons
Western State Teachers Broncos football